Joseph Campot (2 November 1886 – 11 June 1970) was a French rower. He competed in the men's eight event at the 1912 Summer Olympics.

References

1886 births
1970 deaths
French male rowers
Olympic rowers of France
Rowers at the 1912 Summer Olympics
Sportspeople from Bayonne